United Nations Security Council resolution 496, adopted unanimously on 28 May 1982, after examining a report by the Security Council Commission on the Seychelles adopted in Resolution 496 (1981), the Council expressed its concern at the November 1981 coup attempt in the Seychelles by foreign mercenaries, including Mike Hoare, allegedly backed by South Africa, and the subsequent hijacking of an Air India plane.

The Council went on to strongly condemn the mercenary aggression against the Seychelles and the hijacking, emphasising it stood against external interference in the internal affairs of a Member State. The resolution commended the Seychelles for repelling the attack, reiterating Resolution 239 (1967) against the use of mercenaries to attack another Member State.

The resolution ended by establishing an ad hoc committee chaired by France to oversee development funds to repair the damage to the Seychelles and ensure economic reconstruction. It also requested the Secretary-General assist the fund, and extended the mandate of the inquiry into the events by 15 August 1982.

See also
 1981 Seychelles coup d'état attempt
 List of United Nations Security Council Resolutions 501 to 600 (1982–1987)

References
Text of the Resolution at undocs.org

External links
 

 0507
 0507
1982 in Seychelles
 0507
May 1982 events